Ataxia, described by Haldeman in 1847, is an American genus of longhorn beetles of the subfamily Lamiinae, tribe Pteropliini.

Distribution
Ataxia is primarily widespread in South America, but several endemic species are present in Central America and in the Antilles. Only few species reach the South-western United States.

Ataxia contains the following species:
 Ataxia acutipennis (Thomson, 1868)
 Ataxia albisetosa Breuning, 1940
 Ataxia alboscutellata Fisher, 1926
 Ataxia alpha Chemsak & Noguera, 1993
 Ataxia arenaria Martins & Galileo, 2013
 Ataxia arizonica Fisher, 1920
 Ataxia brunnea Champlain & Knull, 1926
 Ataxia camiriensis Galileo & Santos-Silva, 2016
 Ataxia canescens (Bates, 1880)
 Ataxia cayennensis Breuning, 1940
 Ataxia cayensis Chemsak & Feller, 1988
 Ataxia cineracea Galileo & Martins, 2007
 Ataxia crassa Vitali, 2007
 Ataxia crypta (Say, 1831)
 Ataxia cylindrica Breuning, 1940
 Ataxia estoloides Breuning, 1940
 Ataxia falli Breuning, 1961
 Ataxia fulvifrons (Bates, 1885)
 Ataxia haitiensis Fisher, 1932
 Ataxia heppneri Wappes, Santos-Silva & Galileo, 2017
 Ataxia hovorei Lingafelter & Nearns, 2007
 Ataxia hubbardi Fisher, 1924
 Ataxia illita (Bates, 1885)
 Ataxia luteifrons (Bruch, 1926)
 Ataxia mucronata (Bates, 1866)
 Ataxia nivisparsa (Bates, 1885)
 Ataxia obscura (Fabricius, 1801)
 Ataxia obtusa (Bates, 1866)
 Ataxia operaria Erichson in Schomburg, 1848
 Ataxia parva Galileo & Martins, 2011
 Ataxia perplexa (Gahan, 1892)
 Ataxia piauiensis Martins & Galileo, 2012
 Ataxia prolixa (Bates, 1866)
 Ataxia rufitarsis (Bates, 1880)
 Ataxia setulosa Fall, 1907
 Ataxia spinicauda Schaeffer, 1904
 Ataxia spinipennis Chevrolat, 1862
 Ataxia stehliki Chemsak, 1966
 Ataxia tibialis Schaeffer, 1908
 Ataxia uniformis Fisher, 1926
 Ataxia variegata Fisher, 1925
 Ataxia yucatana Breuning, 1940

References

 list of Ataxia-species
 gallery of Ataxia-species

 
Pteropliini
Taxa named by Samuel Stehman Haldeman